Jean-Claude Baron is an Emeritus Professor of Stroke Medicine at the University of Cambridge. He is also a Fellow of the Academy of Medical Sciences. He has authored around 450 peer-reviewed articles.

Education 
Jean-Claude Baron studied clinical neurology at the Pitié-Salpêtrière Hospital in Paris, medical physics at the Commissariat à l'énergie atomique et aux énergies alternatives in Orsay, and functional brain imaging at Harvard University in the United States. He received his medical education and training at the University of Paris, where he also specialized in Neurology.

Research and career 
Baron's principal research interests are in the pathophysiology of stroke and the processes of functional recovery after stroke, which he has mostly studied using imaging techniques.

He primarily used positron emission tomography (PET) in the study of cerebrovascular diseases, using it in conjunction with other techniques such as CT, MR, and SPECT to investigate the pathophysiology of transient ischemic attacks (TIAs) and acute ischemic stroke, as well as the mechanisms underlying post-stroke recovery, in both patients and animal models.

His main findings include the discovery of the ischemic penumbra in humans and the crucial role of hemodynamic impairment in carotid-territory TIAs, as well as crossed cerebellar diaschisis and thalamo-cortical diaschisis.

He has used functional and structural brain imaging to examine the mechanisms underlying cerebral amyloid angiopathy and neurodegenerative illnesses such as Alzheimer's, Parkinson's, and Progressive Supranuclear Palsy.

Baron has over 40 years of professional experience and is currently director of research at INSERM and Paris University.

Awards and honors 
Baron has earned various accolades including the following.
 Fellow of the Academy of Medical Sciences
 Mémain-Pelletier Award for Biomedical Sciences from the French Academy of Sciences (2014)
 Johannes Wepfer Award (2005)
 Ferdinand Dreyfous Award from the French Academy of Medicine (1979)

Selected publications

References 

Year of birth missing (living people)
Living people
Academics of the University of Cambridge
University of Paris alumni
Harvard University alumni
French neurologists
Fellows of the Academy of Medical Sciences (United Kingdom)
French emigrants to the United Kingdom